Deal–Mendenhall Hall  is a historic residence within the Springville Historic District in Springville, Utah, United States, that is listed on the National Register of Historic Places (NRHP).

Description 
The house is located at 163 East 200 North and was built in 1896 It was part of the Springville Multiple Property Submission which added eleven Springville properties to National Register of Historic Places.

It was a home of the family of Romanzo A. Deal, a businessman and civic leader of Springville, and it was later a home of the family of Guy Mendenhall.

It was listed on the NRHP on January 5, 1998.

See also

 National Register of Historic Places listings in Utah County, Utah

References

External links

Houses on the National Register of Historic Places in Utah
Houses in Utah County, Utah
National Register of Historic Places in Utah County, Utah
Buildings and structures in Springville, Utah
Individually listed contributing properties to historic districts on the National Register in Utah